The Return of the Living Dead is a 1985 American comedy horror film written and directed by Dan O'Bannon in his directorial debut, and starring Clu Gulager, James Karen, Thom Matthews, and Don Calfa.  The film tells the story of how a warehouse owner, accompanied by his two employees, mortician friend and a group of teenage punks, deal with the accidental release of a horde of unkillable, brain-hungry zombies onto an unsuspecting town.

The film, described as a "mordant punk comedy," is known for introducing multiple popular concepts to the zombie genre: zombies eating specifically brains, as opposed to eating any form of human flesh; and zombies being invulnerable to a gunshot to the head.

The movie's soundtrack was noteworthy, as it featured several Los Angeles-based deathrock and punk rock bands of the era. The film was a critical success and performed moderately well at the box office. The film has spawned four sequels.

Plot
On July 3, 1984, at the Uneeda medical supply warehouse, foreman Frank Johnson tries to impress new employee Freddy by showing him military drums of toxic gas called Trioxin that wound up in the basement of the building due to a delivery error years before. While hitting the side of a drum to prove it's secure, Frank accidentally unleashes the toxic gas, which seemingly melts the cadaver inside and reanimates another cadaver stored in a meat locker. Joined by their boss Burt, the three try to kill the reanimated corpse by puncturing the brain (which does not work), then dismembering the body. They discover that every part of the zombie's body can survive independently. Burt has the zombie incinerated at a nearby mortuary by his friend Ernie, but this inadvertently causes the deadly gas to contaminate the air, creating a toxic rainfall that reanimates the corpses in the nearby cemetery.

Meanwhile, Freddy's girlfriend Tina and his friends Spider, Trash, Chuck, Casey, Scuz and Suicide arrive at the cemetery to wait for Freddy to finish work. While Trash starts stripping and dancing on a gravestone, Tina goes to the warehouse and wanders into the basement, where she encounters the reanimated but horribly disfigured cadaver from the barrel that was assumed to have dissolved. The rest of the group arrives shortly after and saves her in the nick of time, although Suicide is killed. After Casey realizes she saw Freddy entering the mortuary, the group attempts to reach him through the cemetery, where they are attacked by the re-emerging zombies. Trash is killed and Chuck and Casey flee back to the warehouse, but Spider, Tina, and Scuz reach the mortuary. The three discover Frank and Freddy growing ill from their exposure to the gas and call for paramedics, who say their tests indicate the men are no longer alive even though they are conscious. When Burt and Ernie learn of the dead rising from their graves, they barricade the mortuary. Scuz is killed while protecting the barricade and the zombies eat the paramedics and police who arrive on the scene. The group manages to grab the upper half of one of the zombies and restrain her on the mortuary table. She explains that the reanimated corpses can feel themselves rotting, and eating the brains of the living helps relieve the pain.

With Frank and Freddy showing signs of becoming zombies themselves, Burt has them locked in the chapel, accompanied by Tina when she refuses to abandon Freddy. Freddy soon attempts to eat Tina, prompting Burt, Ernie, and Spider to rescue her by reopening the chapel and blinding Freddy with a strong acid. Frank manages to escape during the chaos and, still having control over his mind, commits suicide by climbing into the cremator. Burt and Spider flee the mortuary in a police car, but the large number of zombies forces Burt to leave Ernie and Tina behind. Ernie and Tina hide in the mortuary's attic, while a blinded Freddy attempts to break in.

Burt and Spider manage to get back inside the warehouse where they find Casey and Chuck. After incapacitating the basement zombie, whom Spider names "Tarbaby," Burt attempts to contact the police but learns they are massacred by the zombies after being overrun. Burt then decides to call the number on the military drums, which reaches military officer Colonel Glover. Notified that the zombies have taken over the area, Glover has the town destroyed by nuclear artillery on the morning of July 4, effectively killing Burt and the other survivors.

In the wake of the nuclear strike on Louisville, Colonel Glover is heard telling his commanding officer that everything went as planned and that the results couldn't be more positive. Only a small area was destroyed, he says, and casualties are limited. As he speaks, the toxic rain falls once more, and zombies are heard screaming in their graves, indicating that the invasion is about to begin again.

Cast

Production

Concept
The film has its roots in a novel by John Russo also called Return of the Living Dead. When Russo and George A. Romero parted ways after their 1968 film Night of the Living Dead, Russo retained the rights to any titles featuring Living Dead while Romero was free to create his own series of sequels, beginning with Dawn of the Dead. Russo and producer Tom Fox planned to bring Return of the Living Dead to the screen in 3D and directed by Tobe Hooper.

Dan O'Bannon was brought in to give the script a polish and after Hooper backed out to make Lifeforce (also from a script by Dan O'Bannon), O'Bannon was offered the director's seat, becoming his 'first big film'.  He accepted on the condition he could rewrite the film radically so as to differentiate it from Romero's films. The film was the first production design credit for William Stout, who would go on to do production design for the Conan the Barbarian franchise among other films.  The appearance of the zombies in the film was inspired by the mummies of Guanajuato, Mexico and the Bog People of Wales, as well as artwork from EC Comics.

The story's featured "2-4-5 Trioxin" chemical developed by the "Darrow Chemical Company" for the military was a play on the real-life Dow Chemical Company and its involvement in the 1960s with the manufacture of Agent Orange, scientifically known by the name 2,4,5-T Dioxin and used in the US Military's Operation Ranch Hand and on Canada's CFB Gagetown Canadian Forces Base in rural New Brunswick during the Vietnam War as a powerful defoliant. Return of the Living Dead makes up a lighter purpose for the chemical's usage, with character Frank suggesting that it was being sprayed on cannabis crops in the 1960s.

Filming
Although the movie is set in Louisville, Kentucky, it was filmed in Burbank, Sylmar, and Downtown Los Angeles in California. The "Tarman" zombie is performed by actor and puppeteer Allan Trautman.

Reception
It currently holds a 91% approval rating on the review aggregate website Rotten Tomatoes, with a rating average of 7.2/10 based on 43 reviews. Its consensus reads: "A punk take on the zombie genre, Return of the Living Dead injects a healthy dose of '80s silliness to the flesh consuming."
It was also nominated for four Saturn Awards, including Best Horror Film, Best Actor for James Karen, Best Director and Best Make-up,  by the Academy of Science Fiction, Fantasy and Horror Films.

Roger Ebert gave the film three out of four stars, writing that the film is "kind of a sensation-machine, made out of the usual ingredients, and the real question is whether it's done with style. It is." Stephen Holden of The New York Times called the film a "mordant punk comedy," and stated that it "is by no means the ultimate horror movie it aspires to be."

Colin Greenland reviewed The Return of the Living Dead for White Dwarf, and stated that "The movie sprawls shapelessly but comfortably, with plenty of gruesome jokes."

Soundtrack

 "Surfin' Dead" by The Cramps
 "Partytime (Zombie Version)" by 45 Grave
 "Nothin' for You" by T.S.O.L.
 "Eyes Without a Face" by The Flesh Eaters
 "Burn the Flames" by Roky Erickson
 "Dead Beat Dance" by The Damned
 "Take a Walk" by Tall Boys
 "Love Under Will" by Jet Black Berries
 "Tonight (We'll Make Love Until We Die)" by SSQ
 "Trash's Theme" by SSQ
 "Young, Fast Iranians" by Straw Dogs: 1991 Hemdale version and subsequent DVD and Blu-ray Releases, though not on official soundtrack album.
 "Partytime (Single Version)" by 45 Grave: Version actually used in the film, though not on official soundtrack album.
 "Panzer Rollen in Afrika vor" by Norbert Schultze: Song playing on Ernie's walkman, though not on official soundtrack album.

Home video
The film was originally released on DVD in the U.K. by Tartan Home Video on March 19, 2001. Up until 2012, this was the only time it had been issued in its original form. In early 2002, a fan-led online campaign was started, which attracted the attention of the director and many of the cast and crew. Several of them commented online that the popular and robust efforts of campaign organizer, Michael Allred, were the direct result of not only the DVD release but that MGM created new supplements due to overwhelming fan support.
 
On August 27, 2002, MGM released a Special Edition DVD in the U.S. with a new cut of the movie (with music alterations due to copyright issues) with a commentary by O'Bannon and a documentary on the making of the film. The cover of the DVD case for the 2002 release glows in the dark. On September 11, 2007, a Collector's Edition of the film was released with additional extra features involving the cast. The different home video releases have featured different soundtracks, often changing the songs used. Also, the basement zombie's ("Tar-Man") voice was altered. Originally, the zombie had a higher, raspier voice that can still be heard in theatrical trailers and releases that contain the original audio.

A 25th anniversary edition was released on September 14, 2010, exclusively for Blu-ray Disc. The Blu-ray Disc version is a 2-disc combo pack with both a Blu-ray Disc and DVD. This release is very similar to the MGM/Fox print from three years earlier.

On June 4, 2012, Second Sight Films in the U.K. released DVD and Blu-ray Disc versions of the film where the original audio and soundtrack in its original form can be selected, the first time since 2001 a release has had this option. The release had its first insight into the movie with the inclusion on a booklet (claimed to be based on Ernie's notes from the events of the film) which was edited from Gary Smart and Christian Seller's publication The Complete History of The Return of the Living Dead.

Scream Factory released a 30th anniversary Collector's Edition Blu-Ray on July 19, 2016. It contains a new 2K scan of the interpositive, along with including the original mono audio. Though note while everything else was restored (the original "Tar-Man" voice and the other songs), the song "Dead Beat Dance" by The Damned could not be restored. MGM also released another edition with hand-drawn cover art.

References

External links

 
 
 
 
 
 
 
 

1985 films
1985 comedy films
1985 horror films
1985 independent films
1980s comedy horror films
1980s science fiction horror films
American black comedy films
American comedy horror films
American exploitation films
American independent films
American satirical films
American science fiction horror films
American sequel films
American zombie comedy films
Films directed by Dan O'Bannon
Films set in 1984
Films set in Louisville, Kentucky
Films shot in California
Films with screenplays by Dan O'Bannon
Funeral homes in fiction
Holiday horror films
Independence Day (United States) films
Orion Pictures films
Punk films
Return of the Living Dead (film series)
American splatter films
1980s English-language films
1980s American films